William Trickett Smith Sr. (August 16, 1937 – March 20, 2021) was an American lawyer and the former chairman of the Dauphin County Republican Committee. In 1985, he was disbarred and imprisoned for bid rigging and convicted of theft by unlawful taking and deception in 2010. He was the father of William Trickett Smith II, convicted in 2011 of murdering his wife and dismembering her while in Peru.

In 2012, Trickett Sr. was convicted of arson and insurance fraud while facing disbarment and investigation for taking funds from his clients estates.
In 2014, he was again sentenced for conspiring to help his son escape by filing a false criminal complaint to have him temporarily extradited from Peru back to Pennsylvania.

Smith was one of the main prosecution witnesses in the trial of Pennsylvania Treasurer R. Budd Dwyer. Smith later admitted in an interview shown in Honest Man: The Life of R. Budd Dwyer that he had lied under oath in his own 1985 trial when he denied offering Dwyer a bribe. In the documentary, he maintained that his testimony at Dwyer's 1986 trial—that he offered Dwyer a bribe and that Dwyer accepted this offer—was truthful.

Smith died March 20, 2021, in Camp Hill, Pennsylvania.

References

1937 births
2021 deaths
American prisoners and detainees
American people convicted of theft
R. Budd Dwyer
Disbarred American lawyers
People from Dauphin County, Pennsylvania
Pennsylvania Republicans